Parapilocrocis is a genus of moths of the family Crambidae described by Eugene G. Munroe in 1967.

Species
Parapilocrocis albomarginalis (Schaus, 1920)
Parapilocrocis citribasalis Munroe, 1967

Former species
Parapilocrocis albipunctalis (Hampson, 1918)

References

Spilomelinae
Crambidae genera
Taxa named by Eugene G. Munroe